The mechanic's grip is one of many ways to comfortably hold a deck of cards.  

The standard grip taught in many dealer schools around the world, it is also widely used by magicians and card cheaters as it provides a sturdy and versatile means by which to hold the cards. Covering the deck with the hand allows the holder to manipulate the cards so as to view the top card's face (useful in poker or blackjack) or to lift and select a card without the spectator's knowledge (useful in card tricks).

Instructions

To form the mechanic's grip, first hold the deck in the hand, in the same way as holding a hammer or tool. The cards should be lying flat in the palm with the longer side of the deck lying along the fingers. Take the pointer finger and move it to the short side facing away from the person holding the deck. Take the middle finger, ring finger, and little finger and place them on the long side of the deck. Finally the thumb holds the deck together on the long side opposite of the other fingers. With this grip, more of the deck should be covered by the hand, thus making it more difficult for spectators to see what the magician is doing.

References 

Poker gameplay and terminology
Card tricks
Deception